This article lists lakes with a water volume of more than 100 km3, ranked by volume. The volume of a lake is a difficult quantity to measure. Generally, the volume must be inferred from bathymetric data by integration. Lake volumes can also change dramatically over time and during the year, especially for salt lakes in arid climates. For these reasons, and because of changing research, information on lake volumes can vary considerably from source to source. The base data for this article are from The Water Encyclopedia (1990). Where volume data from more recent surveys or other authoritative sources have been used, that usage is referenced in the respective entry. The total volume of Earth's lakes is 199,000 km3.

The list 
The volumes of the lakes below vary little by season.  This list does not include reservoirs; if it did, six reservoirs would appear on the list: Lake Kariba at 26th, Bratsk Reservoir, Lake Volta, Lake Nasser, Manicouagan Reservoir, and Lake Guri.

Estuaries and lagoons are not included either. Examples: Lake Melville (estuary) and Lake Maracaibo (lagoon), comparable with Lagoa dos Patos.

However, by 2007 it had shrunk to 10% of its original volume and was divided into three lakes, none of which are large enough to appear on this list.

By continent 
 Africa: Lake Tanganyika
 Antarctica: Lake Vostok
 Asia: Caspian Sea
 Australia: Lake Eyre
 Europe: Lake Ladoga
 North America: Lake Superior
 Oceania: Lake Te Anau
 South America: Lake Titicaca

See also 

 List of lakes by depth
 List of lakes by area
 List of largest lakes of Europe

Notes and references 
Notes

References

Lakes